Simon J. Liebowitz (June 5, 1905 – May 24, 1998) was an American lawyer and politician from New York.

Life
He was born on June 5, 1905, in Brooklyn, New York City. He attended Public School No. 129 and Boys High School. He graduated from the City College of New York, and from Brooklyn Law School in 1926. He practiced law in New York City. He married Esther Nitzburg and together they had two children.  They remained married until Esther's death at age 43. He thereafter married Elsie Chasanoff (1908–2007), who was a widow and had one daughter and together they formed a new family with all three of their offspring.

Liebowitz was a member of the New York State Senate from 1960 to 1968, sitting in the 172nd, 173rd, 174th, 175th, 176th and 177th New York State Legislatures.

In November 1968, he was elected to the New York City Civil Court; and in November 1969, to the New York Supreme Court. He remained on the bench until the end of 1975 when he reached the constitutional age limit. Afterwards he resumed the practice of law and remained active in various capacities of the law until his death.

He died on May 24, 1998, in Good Samaritan Hospital in Palm Beach, Florida.

Sources

1905 births
1998 deaths
Politicians from Brooklyn
People from Palm Beach, Florida
Democratic Party New York (state) state senators
City College of New York alumni
Brooklyn Law School alumni
New York Supreme Court Justices
20th-century American judges
Boys High School (Brooklyn) alumni
20th-century American politicians